Čest a sláva is a 1968 Czechoslovak film. It starred Josef Kemr.

References

External links
 

1968 films
Czechoslovak adventure films
1960s Czech-language films
1960s historical adventure films
Czech historical adventure films
1960s Czech films